The following lists events that happened during 1967 in South Africa.

Incumbents
 State President:
 Charles Robberts Swart (until 31 May).
 Tom Naudé (acting from 1 June).
 Prime Minister: John Vorster.
 Chief Justice: Lucas Cornelius Steyn.

Events
January
 – The African National Congress and the Zimbabwe African People's Union form an alliance for armed struggle against South Africa and Rhodesia.

February
 28 – Eben Dönges is elected second State President but suffers a stroke before he can take office.

June
 1 – Tom Naudé becomes acting State President of South Africa.
 12 – The Terrorism Act, 1967 is passed.

July
 14-15 Snow falls in the Transvaal. The Northern Transvaal records its first snowfall.
 The Liberation Committee of the Organisation of African Unity urges "freedom fighters" to invade South Africa and South West Africa.

August
 4 – Military conscription becomes compulsory for all white men in South Africa over the age of 16.

September
 8 – South African Police officially disclose that SAP counter-insurgency units are deployed in Rhodesia to counter Umkhonto we Sizwe.

December
 3 – Professor Christiaan Barnard carries out the world's first heart transplant at Groote Schuur Hospital.

Unknown date
 The South African Police starts with counter-insurgency training.
 Umkhonto we Sizwe members conduct their first military actions in north-western Rhodesia in campaigns known as Wankie and Sepolilo.
 KGB double agent Yui Loginov is arrested in South Africa after the CIA betrayed him.

Births
 1 January – Francois Pienaar, rugby player
 9 January – Dave Matthews, South African–born American musician
 23 January – Nathi Mthethwa, national minister
 12 February – Nambitha Mpumlwana, actress
 4 March – Daryll Cullinan, cricketer
 15 May – John Tlale, football player
 10 June – Karen Roberts, field hockey player
 26 June – Doctor Khumalo, football player
 27 June – Andre Arendse, football player
 10 July – Hennie le Roux, rugby player
 16 July – Joel Stransky, rugby player
 30 August – John Moeti, football player
 6 October – Heyneke Meyer, Springboks coach
 4 November – Rapulana Seiphemo, film and television actor
 23 November – Oskido, recording artist, DJ, record producer and businessman. Co-founder of Kalawa Jazmee Records.
 23 November – Gary Kirsten, cricketer & cricket coach
 16 December – Claire Johnston, singer

Deaths
 20 May – Jan Gysbert Hugo Bosman (Bosman de Ravelli), concert pianist and composer.
 2 July – Professor I.W. van der Merwe (Boerneef), writer and poet.
 21 July – Albert Lutuli, teacher and president of the African National Congress). (b. c. 1898)

Railways

Sports

References

South Africa
Years in South Africa
History of South Africa